Upload with Shaquille O'Neal is an American comedy television series starring Shaquille O'Neal. It premiered on February 21, 2013, on truTV. It was announced in April 2013 that truTV has ordered an additional six episodes. New episodes were supposed to begin airing on February 26, 2014, but were never released.

Premise
The series is hosted by Shaq with co-hosts Gary Owen, Godfrey and Rachel Feinstein as they review and comment on some of the funniest videos on the internet. The series also shows the hosts creating their own viral videos, pranking others and making parodies of recent pop culture stories. Each week also features a different guest comedian.

Episodes

References

2010s American comedy television series
2013 American television series debuts
2013 American television series endings
English-language television shows
Shaquille O'Neal
TruTV original programming